Mureto is a red Portuguese wine grape variety.

Synonyms
Mureto is also known under the synonyms Malvasia Preta, Moreto, Mureto du Dão, Muretto, and Sillas.

Other grape varieties
Mureto is used as a synonym for the grape variety Camarate Tinto. Mureto do Alentejo is a synonym for Moreto.

See also
List of Portuguese grape varieties

References

Red wine grape varieties
Portuguese wine